Bounce is a 2003 jazz album by American jazz musician Terence Blanchard, released by Blue Note Records.

Background 
Bounce is the Blue Note recording debut of trumpeter and composer Terence Blanchard. The album is a mix of the sounds of Africa, Brazil and America, with the styles of swing, hard bop, free form, groove and early 70's fusion. The Grammy Award winner Terence Blanchard is the musician who in the 1980s played the trumpet for bands led by jazz luminaries Lionel Hampton and Art Blakey. Blanchard also wrote music scores for films such as Spike Lee's Jungle Fever (1991), Clockers (1995), 4 Little Girls (1997), 25th Hour (2003), and the highly acclaimed Malcolm X (1992).

Reception
Thom Jurek of Allmusic stated "Remarkable. Ultimately, Bounce is the most perfectly paced of all of Blanchard's recordings. He divides his time between tempos, but always comes back to silence to ground himself and begin over. In terms of his lyrical lines, they have never been in a sense more simple or more sophisticated (check out the blissed-out harmonics in "Innocence"), where the individual players become identified by their ensemble contributions first and then as soloists. Mr. Blanchard's own soling has never been more restrained or more profound. In his economy of phrase, entire sound worlds become evident that were never noticeable before. On Bounce, Blanchard proves that he is the trumpet player, composer, and bandleader who is moving jazz, albeit at his own pace, in new directions that encompass both a new look at Western musical systems and never leave the human heart out of the equation. This is his masterpiece thus far and a high-water mark for anybody else to follow."

John Murph of JazzTimes noted 'For the most, on Bounce, Blanchard leads an ensemble that recalls those of one of his mentors, Art Blakey... Ultimately though, it’s Blanchard, who shines brightest. His succinct solos are always filled with the right amount of rhythmic crackle and subtle nuance. Whether he’s firing off searing notes that seem to scrap the clouds, as on “On the Verge,” “Azania” or “Fred Brown,” or lowering the flames to candlelight flicker as on “Nocturna,” his solos gleam with clarity, emotional poignancy and rhythmic punch. In other words, they bounce."

Track listing

Personnel 
 Terence Blanchard - trumpet
 Lionel Loueke - vocals, guitar
 Brice Winston - soprano saxophone, tenor saxophone
 Aaron Parks - piano
 Robert Glasper - piano, organ
 Brandon Owens - bass
 Eric Harland - drums

Chart performance

References

2003 albums
Terence Blanchard albums
Blue Note Records albums